August and Amalia Shivelbine House is a historic home located at Cape Girardeau, Missouri, United States.  It was built about 1890, and is a -story, Queen Anne style brick dwelling.  It has a front gable roof and segmentally arched windows.  It features an entry porch with a truncated hipped roof.

It was listed on the National Register of Historic Places in 1999. It is located in the Courthouse-Seminary Neighborhood Historic District.

References

Individually listed contributing properties to historic districts on the National Register in Missouri
Houses on the National Register of Historic Places in Missouri
Queen Anne architecture in Missouri
Houses completed in 1890
Houses in Cape Girardeau County, Missouri
National Register of Historic Places in Cape Girardeau County, Missouri